Adele Ann Wilby (born 30 January 1950), married name Balasingham, is the Australian-born former leader of the women's wing of Liberation Tigers of Tamil Eelam of Sri Lanka. She currently resides in London.

Biography
She was born in Warragul, Victoria in Australia. She became a professional nurse and worked in Gippsland, 150 km from Melbourne. She eventually migrated to the United Kingdom where in 1978 she met and married Sri Lankan born British citizen Anton Balasingham. Mr. Balasingham later became the chief strategist and peace negotiator for the LTTE in Sri Lanka.
Her husband Anton died on 14 December 2006.

Eelam Tamil Supporter
Adele Balasingham moved with her husband initially to Madras in India then on to northern part of Sri Lanka in Jaffna during the early stages of the Sri Lankan civil war. She worked for the welfare of women in Tamil community who are worse affected by the war.

Peace negotiator
She later participated as part of the LTTE peace negotiating team in numerous peace talks with the various Sri Lankan government negotiating teams since 2002. She is also the author of number of books including "Women Fighters of Liberation Tigers" (1993) and the semi autobiographical The Will to Freedom

See also
LTTE
Sri Lankan civil war
Black July
Human Rights in Sri Lanka
State terrorism in Sri Lanka

References

1950 births
Living people
Sri Lankan rebels
People from Warragul
Australian feminists
British feminists
Australian activists
Liberation Tigers of Tamil Eelam members
Australian emigrants to Sri Lanka
Australian emigrants to England
Women in war